The U.S. Senate Agriculture Subcommittee on Commodities, Risk Management, and Trade is one of five subcommittees of the U.S. Senate Committee on Agriculture, Nutrition and Forestry.

This subcommittee has jurisdiction over legislation on agricultural commodities, including cotton, dairy products, feed grains, wheat, tobacco, peanuts, sugar, wool, rice, oilseeds and soybeans and price and income support programs.

Name changes 

The subcommittee was renamed for the 115th United States Congress (2017).

It was previously:
 112th-114th Congresses: Subcommittee on Commodities, Markets, Trade and Risk Management
 111th Congress: Subcommittee on Production, Income Protection and Price Support
 110th Congress: Subcommittee on Production, Income Protection and Price Support Jurisdiction
 109th Congress: Subcommittee on Production and Price Competitiveness

Members, 118th Congress

Historical subcommittee rosters

116th Congress

117th Congress

References

 

Agriculture Production and Price Competitiveness